The Sanjak of Viçitrina (/ Vučitrnski sandžak), also known as the Pristina Pashaluk (Albanian: Pashallëku i Prishtinës;  / Prištinski pašaluk), was a sanjak (second-level administrative division) of the Ottoman Empire in Rumelia (the Balkans), in present-day Kosovo. It was named after its administrative center Vučitrn.

History 
Vushtrri was captured from the Serbian Despotate by the Ottomans in 1455, it remained under control of the governor of Skopsko Krajište until the definite annexation of the Serbian Despotate in 1459. The first Ottoman records include the territory of the sanjak as Vilayet-i Vlk (Vilayet of Vuk), a reference to Vuk Branković.

According to Ottoman defters of 1525—1561 the sanjak of Vučitrn included the following towns: Vučitrn, Pristina,  Janjevo, Novo Brdo, Belasica, Belo Brdo, Koporići, Trepča and Donja Trepča. In 1459-1826 it was part of Rumelia Eyalet, except for a brief period after 1541 when it was included into newly established Budin Eyalet. It was also part of Temeşvar Eyalet briefly before returning to Rumelia Eyalet.

Contemporary documents like the 1566-7 defter of the sanjak show that the c. 1000 villages of the region were mostly inhabited by Christians, with Muslims comprising forty-six households not in compact communities but spread in thirty villages. As in nearby Pristina the rate of conversion of Orthodox Slavs to Islam was low. Ottoman traveller Evliya Çelebi visited the capital of the sanjak in 1660 and observed that the population spoke "Albanian and Turkish, but not Bosnian". According to Ottoman sources, sanjak was inhabited with Albanians, Vlachs, Slavs, Turks, Gypsies and others, of Muslim, Orthodox and Catholic confessions. Among the Christians a Catholic community also existed as evidenced by a local landmark known as the "Latin cemetery".

In 1717, during the Austro-Turkish War, an uprising broke out in the sanjak, raised by the Serb rayah. It was brutally suppressed.

In 1864 during the administrative reforms of the era, it was demoted to a kaza of the newly established sanjak of Pristina.

Economy 
A group of mines on the Kopaonik mountain together with those in Novo Brdo and Janjevo belonged to this sanjak.

Governors
Hussein Bey
Malik Pasha ( 1807–1820s)
Yashar Pasha ( 1830–1836)

References 

Sanjaks of the Ottoman Empire in Europe
Ottoman period in the history of Kosovo
Sanjak of Vučitrn
1864 disestablishments in the Ottoman Empire
1459 establishments in the Ottoman Empire
States and territories disestablished in 1864